The Czechoslovakia women's national under-16 basketball team was a national basketball team of Czechoslovakia. It represented the country in women's international under-16 basketball competitions.

FIBA U16 Women's European Championship participations

See also
Czechoslovakia women's national basketball team
Czechoslovakia women's national under-19 basketball team

References

External links
Archived records of Czechoslovakia team participations

Basketball in Czechoslovakia
Basketball
Women's national under-16 basketball teams